Martin Wierig (born 10 June 1987 in Beckendorf-Neindorf) is a German discus thrower.

International competitions

References

1987 births
Living people
People from Börde (district)
Sportspeople from Saxony-Anhalt
German male discus throwers
Olympic male discus throwers
Olympic athletes of Germany
Athletes (track and field) at the 2012 Summer Olympics
World Athletics Championships athletes for Germany
German national athletics champions